The 120 members of the seventh Knesset were elected on 28 October 1969. The breakdown by party was as follows:
Alignment: 56
Gahal: 26
National Religious Party: 12
Agudat Yisrael: 4 
Independent Liberals: 4 
National List: 4 
Rakah: 3
Progress and Development: 2 
Poalei Agudat Yisrael: 2
Cooperation and Brotherhood: 2 
HaOlam HaZeh – Koah Hadash: 2
Free Centre: 2
Maki: 1

List of members

Replacements

External links
Members of the Seventh Knesset Knesset website

 
07